The Anarchist Organization of the Spanish Region (OARE) was an anarchist organization founded in 1888 during the last congress of the Federation of Workers of the Spanish Region (FTRE), held in Valencia. It had an ephemeral life as it disappeared the following year.

History 
Between May 18 and 20, 1888, an "expanded" Congress of the Federation of Workers of the Spanish Region was held in Barcelona, but it was not attended by the Andalusian federations which had already opted for anarcho-communism and illegalism. The delegates, the vast majority of whom were Catalan, and the Federal Committee decided to create the Spanish Federation of Resistance to Capital, better known by the name of Union and Solidarity Pact, whose purpose was "to unite in a common action the resistant force of the Spanish proletariat to direct it against the prevailing capitalism ..." For this purpose, "unconditional support for any strike promoted by workers to safeguard their outraged dignity or to improve their working conditions" was approved, although it was recommended that strikes only be carried out "under favorable conditions".

In October 1888 the "Pact" held a Congress in Valencia in which it was decided to dissolve the Federation of Workers of the Spanish Region, and separate union activity, which would be reserved for the newly created Union and Solidarity Pact. Meanwhile, the Anarchist Organization of the Spanish Region was founded for the purpose of revolutionary activity, "which was the least organization possible; the commission created had no other function than to act as a liaison. There were no statutes or disciplinary rules." But the new organization disappeared the following year.

References

Bibliography 

1888 establishments in Spain
1889 disestablishments in Spain
Anarchist organisations in Spain
Anarchist Federations